The Ajax Metal Company Plant is a historic metal factory in the Kensington neighborhood of Philadelphia. It was owned by the Ajax Metal Company, which smelted and refined brass and bronze at the plant. It is made up of seven sections built from 1907 to 1951.

The building has since became part of The Fillmore.

References

Manufacturing plants in the United States
1907 establishments in Pennsylvania
Industrial buildings completed in 1907
Buildings and structures in Philadelphia